Jakub Sylvestr (born 2 February 1989) is a Slovak professional footballer who plays as a forward for Polish club Resovia. He made six appearances for the Slovakia national team.

Career
Sylvestr scored his first hat-trick in a match against Tatran Prešov on 4 April 2009.

On 19 February 2017, Sylvestr scored in his league debut for Danish Superliga club AaB. In his second match he scored a hattrick, and was voted Player of the Month in the league. In December 2017, he left the club.

On 20 October 2020, Sylvestr joined Indian Super League club Chennaiyin FC on a one-year deal. He appeared with the club in 19 league matches and scored twice as Chennaiyin finished on eighth position.

On 9 January 2023, Sylvestr joined Polish second division side Resovia.

Honours
Individual
 2. Bundesliga top scorer: 2013–14
 Danish Superliga Player of the Month: February 2017

References

External links
 
 

1989 births
Living people
Sportspeople from Banská Bystrica
Association football forwards
Slovak footballers
Slovakia international footballers
ŠK Slovan Bratislava players
FC Petržalka players
GNK Dinamo Zagreb players
FC Erzgebirge Aue players
1. FC Nürnberg players
SC Paderborn 07 players
AaB Fodbold players
Beitar Jerusalem F.C. players
Bnei Yehuda Tel Aviv F.C. players
F.C. Ashdod players
Hapoel Haifa F.C. players
Chennaiyin FC players
FK Žalgiris players
Resovia (football) players
Slovak Super Liga players
Croatian Football League players
2. Bundesliga players
Danish Superliga players
Israeli Premier League players
Indian Super League players
A Lyga players

Slovak expatriate footballers
Expatriate footballers in Croatia
Expatriate footballers in Germany
Expatriate men's footballers in Denmark
Expatriate footballers in Israel
Expatriate footballers in India
Expatriate footballers in Lithuania
Expatriate footballers in Poland
Slovak expatriate sportspeople in Croatia
Slovak expatriate sportspeople in Germany
Slovak expatriate sportspeople in Denmark
Slovak expatriate sportspeople in Israel
Slovak expatriate sportspeople in India
Slovak expatriate sportspeople in Lithuania
Slovak expatriate sportspeople in Poland